Jon Henry Gordon is a makeup artist. He was nominated at the 82nd Academy Awards for his work on the film The Young Victoria in the category of Best Makeup. He shared his nomination with Jenny Shircore.

References

External links

Living people
Year of birth missing (living people)
Make-up artists